Kim Huffman (sometimes credited as Kymberley Huffman) is a Canadian actress born in St. Catharines, Ontario. She trained to be an opera singer, but is most known for her television and cinema roles.

Career 
Huffman played Lisa Trekker in the Channel 4 production of Dennis Potter's Lipstick on Your Collar. She also played Donna in the Toronto production of Mamma Mia! from 2004 to 2005. She also played Cosette in the original Mirvish production of Les Misérables at the Royal Alexandra Theatre.

In the Canadian television drama series Wild Roses, Huffman played the female lead (Maggie Henry).

Filmography

Film

Television

References

External links

Canadian television actresses
Living people
Year of birth missing (living people)
Best Supporting Actress in a Drama Series Canadian Screen Award winners
Canadian film actresses
20th-century Canadian actresses
21st-century Canadian actresses
Actresses from Ontario
People from St. Catharines